Nicole Seibert (née Hohloch; born 25 October 1964), known professionally as Nicole, is a German singer, songwriter, musician and producer.
In 1982, she became the first German representative to win the Eurovision Song Contest. She has released more than 25 studio albums and 80 singles, some of which she performed and recorded in, among other languages, English, Dutch, and French. She wrote the music and lyrics for some of her recordings.

Early life 
Hohloch was born in Saarbrücken, Saarland, West Germany. She began performing at the age of four, but did not achieve commercial success until she was 16, when her first single ("Flieg nicht so hoch, mein kleiner Freund") was released. It peaked at #2 in Austria and reached Top 40 positions on multiple European music charts.

When she was 17, she won the 1982 Eurovision Song Contest with "Ein bißchen Frieden", which reached #1 on multiple European music charts. After the end of the contest's voting, Hohloch reprised the song by performing parts of it in English, French and Dutch, along with the original German.

Interviewed years later, she made a statement regarding the points received from Israel: "But the most important victory (was) that a German girl gets 12 points from Israel with a song about peace." 

In the interview, she also stated that she received an invitation from the Israeli government (which she accepted) to go to Tel Aviv to sing for soldiers stationed there.

She recorded an English version of "A Little Peace", which reached #1 on the UK Singles Chart. It went on to be the 500th number one single in the UK Singles Chart. Full versions in French ("La Paix sur Terre"), Dutch ("Een beetje vrede"), Spanish ("Un poco de paz"), Danish ("En smule fred"), Slovene ("Malo miru"), Russian ("Немного мира"), Polish ("Troszeczkę ziemi, troszeczkę słońca"), and Hungarian ("Egy kis nyugalmat kívánok én", with Neoton Família) have also been recorded.

Later in 1982, she released two studio albums, one German (Ein bißchen Frieden) and the other in English (A Little Peace). Like the title tracks, most of the songs have corresponding German and English tracks.

In 2005 she co-produced her album Alles Fliesst, which was released in May of that year.

In 2008, she released the album Mitten ins Herz, which was accompanied by a three-month "unplugged" tour that ended in January 2009.

For the recordings of songs in other languages, she's worked with, among others, Paul Greedus, and Jean-Paul Cara. 

In 2016 she worked with Siegel and Meinunger when making her studio album Traumfänger, and Hohloch (as Seibert) is also credited with some of the compositions.

In 2020, Hohloch celebrated her 40th anniversary in the music industry with a concert tour; however, these dates were re-scheduled due to the COVID-19 pandemic.

Mostly associated with being a Schlager musician, she has also recorded and released jazz, pop, rock and gospel songs.

Personal life 
Hohloch is one of four children, born to Marliese and Siegfried Hohloch. She grew up with her brother and two sisters in the small community of Nohfelden in Saarland. It was there that she attended school and graduated from high school. She is an honorary citizen of her hometown of Nohfelden.

Hohloch married Winfried Seibert (a childhood friend she had known since she was 14) in a civil ceremony on 17 August 1984; a day later they had a wedding ceremony in a church. They have two children.

She likes to give concerts in churches because of the atmosphere and acoustics. Since she was a child, she has found answers in her spirituality and firmly believes that guardian angels will take care of her. This belief was reinforced by some events in her life. In one such instance, Hohloch had planned a trip for Thailand in the winter of 2004, around the time the tsunami struck, killing over 220,000 people. Due to strong recommendations from friends, she cancelled her trip to Thailand and went to South Africa instead.

She supports various humanitarian causes, such as child abuse prevention, and healthy activities for homeless children in the Philippines. She continues to campaign for Rett syndrome and for "life without chains". She has been to Africa twice for Welthungerhilfe.

Honors and awards 
 1982: First place at the Eurovision Song Contest
 1983: Second place at the World Popular Song Festival in Tokyo with the song "So viele Lieder sind in mir"
 1991: Winner of the German Schlagerparade with the song "Ein leises Lied".
 1993: Echo Award for Best Schlager Female Artist (of 1992)
 1999: Saarland Order of Merit

Discography

Studio albums

Literature 

 Guido Knopp, Peter Arens: Our best. The 100 greatest Germans. Econ, Munich 2003, .

References

External links

Official Website

1964 births
Living people
Eurovision Song Contest winners
Eurovision Song Contest entrants for Germany
Eurovision Song Contest entrants of 1982
Schlager musicians
German women musicians
German-language singers
People from Saarbrücken
Nicole
Recipients of the Saarland Order of Merit
Echo (music award) winners